Tom Fogerty is Tom Fogerty's first solo album.

Track listing

All songs written by Tom Fogerty.
	
 "The Legend of Alcatraz" – 2:35 
 "Lady of Fatima" – 4:27 
 "Beauty is Under the Skin" – 2:29 
 "Wondering" – 2:31 
 "My Pretty Baby" – 2:24
 "Train to Nowhere" – 3:39 
 "Everyman" – 2:11 
 "The Me Song" – 2:26 
 "Cast the First Stone" – 2:11 
 "Here Stands the Clown" – 2:52

Personnel

 Tom Fogerty – guitar, harmonica, vocals
 Rodger Collins – vocals ("Train to Nowhere")
 Russ Gary – guitar
 John Kahn – bass
 Billy Mundi – percussion
 Merl Saunders – keyboards, vocals
 Bill Vitt – drums, congas

Charts

Singles

References

External links
[ Tom Fogerty (album) in allmusic.com]

1972 debut albums
Tom Fogerty albums
Fantasy Records albums